William J. "Bill" Rexford (March 14, 1927 – April 18, 1994) was a stock car driver in the early 1950s. He is best remembered for winning the 1950 NASCAR Grand National Series championship at only 23 years old. Rexford currently holds the distinction as NASCAR's youngest Cup Champion.

Biography

Born in Conewango Valley, New York to Kermit and Edith Rexford, Rexford made his name driving stock cars in Western New York. He got his introduction at a young age as his father owned a Chevrolet dealership in the village. At age 16, he made his racing debut at a nearby track in Leon, New York. After he turned 18, he stopped his racing career to join the United States Navy during World War II, during that time, he was stationed in Newport, Rhode Island. After his discharge, he went back home to New York and started racing at bullrings in Buffalo, Rochester, and everywhere in between. When NASCAR introduced its "Strictly Stock" series in 1949, Rexford made three starts, with his best finish being a 3rd at Heidelberg Raceway. He went into full-time competition in the newly renamed Grand National Series in 1950. He and teammate Lloyd Moore became the first Northern-born drivers to go full time on the circuit.  He competed in 17 of the 19 races that season, driving Oldsmobiles, Fords, and Mercuries owned by nearby Jamestown, New York resident Julian Buesink. He scored his first and only win in the fifth race of the year at Canfield Speedway.

Rexford was consistent and battled for the points lead for most of the year. His two biggest competitors were legends Curtis Turner and then-rookie Fireball Roberts.  A third contender, Lee Petty, had been stripped of 809 points earlier in the season for competing in non-NASCAR sanctioned races and was essentially robbed of a realistic shot at the title. Late in the year, Rexford was able to take the points lead as both Roberts and Turner suffered from inconsistency.

In the final race of the year at Occoneechee Speedway, Rexford was locked in a tight battle with Fireball for the championship, holding the points lead by a slim margin.  Rexford's engine expired early, and his championship hopes nearly went up in smoke. All Roberts needed to do now was finish in the top five, but trademark desire to win led him to push his car and his engine gave out with less than 50 laps to go, giving Rexford a dramatic, and controversial championship.

1950 proved to be Rexford's lone full-time campaign in NASCAR's highest division. He moved back to the Northeast and remained a part-time competitor in the Grand National ranks until 1953, when he ran his last race in Rochester, New York. He finished 5th, driving the #60 Chevrolet for long-time car owner Julian Buesink. After 1953, Rexford joined the Midwest Association for Race Car (MERC) in 1954 (now known as ARCA). As a result, Bill France banned Rexford from racing and fined him $1,000 in the process, which Rexford refused to do. He raced until 1956 when he retired from racing at the age of 29. After he moved to Arizona and started a trucking company for 25 years. After that, he sold the company and retired to California where he died after a long illness.

71 years after his lone Cup Champion, Rexford is still the youngest driver to win a championship in what has become the NASCAR Cup Series, doing so at age 23. He remained the only driver from the Northeast to win a championship until 2017 when New Jersey’s Martin Truex Jr. won, and was the only non-Southerner to win a title until 1989 when Missouri's Rusty Wallace won, a feat which has been matched many times since. Rexford was the only series champion that was not included among NASCAR's 50 Greatest Drivers in 1998 and is the only champion from 1949 to 2003 not to be inducted into the NASCAR Hall of Fame. He is also one of two Cup Series champions who have retired not to be inducted into the Hall of Fame, as Jimmie Johnson is also not an inductee yet, though he has not reached the minimum three-year retirement period as of 2022. He is the only Cup champion to have just one career win and the first of four drivers to win the title with just one win on the season, being followed by Ned Jarrett in 1961, Benny Parsons in 1973, and Matt Kenseth in 2003.

Motorsports career results

NASCAR
(key) (Bold – Pole position awarded by qualifying time. Italics – Pole position earned by points standings or practice time. * – Most laps led.)

Grand National Series

References

External links
 

1927 births
1994 deaths
NASCAR Cup Series champions
NASCAR drivers
People from Chautauqua County, New York
Racing drivers from New York (state)